The Developmentally Disabled Assistance and Bill of Rights Act is a US law providing federal funds to Councils on Developmental Disabilities, Protection and Advocacy Systems, as well as University Centers. The law defined the relatively new term "developmental disability" to include specific conditions that originate prior to age 18, are expected to continue indefinitely, and that constitute a substantial handicap. These conditions included intellectual disability, cerebral palsy, epilepsy, autism, and dyslexia.

See also 
 Supported employment#US Legal Basis for Supported Employment
 The Developmental Disabilities Assistance and Bill of Rights Act of 2000

References

External links 
 https://www.congress.gov/bill/94th-congress/house-bill/4005

1975 in law
94th United States Congress
United States federal disability legislation
Anti-discrimination law in the United States
Disability law in the United States